Vlad Țepeș or Vlad the Impaler (1428/31 – 1476/77) was voivode (or prince) of Wallachia three times between 1448 and his death.

Vlad Țepeș may also refer to:
Vlad Tepes (band), a French black metal band
Vlad Țepeș (film), a 1979 Romanian film
Vlad Țepeș, Călărași, a commune
Vlad Țepeș, Giurgiu, a village
Vlad Țepeș League, a political party in interwar Romania
528th Reconnaissance Battalion "Vlad Țepeș", an element of the 2nd Infantry Division of the Romanian Land Forces

See also
 Dracula vlad-tepes, a species of Dracula orchid